William Shatner Live is actor William Shatner's 1977 live album. It was released on Lemli Records in the United States on two discs with a gate-fold sleeve and poster.

The album contains a written introduction by Sondra Marshak and Myrna Culbreath.

Text from liner notes:
The idea of a one man show had intrigued me for a long time. It's a well known fact that the film is a director's medium and the stage belongs to the actor.  Once the curtain goes up nobody yells "cut."  But the one man show is the ultimate of the actor's medium and it was this thought that led me back again and again to what I could do, alone, on the stage.  It would be merciless, I knew.  If I were good, it would be the actor's dream-- but if it failed I would be alone.  Alone up there with thousands of eyes peering at me -- opera glasses raised for a closer look, and the unasked but heavily felt question "what's he going to do?"

All this was going through my head as I learned the lines -- all this was in front of my eyes as I lay down at night -- and when the day came that I was to open at Texas A&M University I was filled with fear.

A very primitive fear -- the fear of the actor.  The nightmare that all actors have from time to time is appearing naked in front of an audience -- not knowing the lines, not knowing the play -- I was living the dream.

Thirty-five hundred people awaited me expectantly; the buzz of their voices reached me backstage, the lights dimmed, the M.C. announced my name and I walked out. The spotlight hit me like a physical force and I was on -- oh muse, be with me know -- I took a breath & started to speak...

(signed) William Shatner

Track listing

Credits
 Arrangement on "Go with Me / High Flight", "The Flight of Man" and "War of the Worlds" – Mark Goldenberg
 Keyboards and synthesizers performance and programming – Jim Hirsen
 Acoustic guitars – Mark Goldenberg
 Engineering – by Bruce Ablin
 Mastering – Frank De Luna
 Writing – Susan Price Root
 Art direction – Ria Lewerke
 Photography – Moshe Brakha
 (c) and (p) 1977 Lemli Music, Inc., 760 N. La Cienega, Los Angeles, California
 Edited and assembled at Sun-West Studios, Hollywood, California
 All music recorded and mixed at Spectrum Studios, Venice, California
 Mastered at A&M Studios, Hollywood, California
 William Shatner Live presented by Jerry Tokofsky Productions, conceived by Susan Price Root and Jerry Tokofsky
 Special thanks to Marcy Shatner for spiritual and practical guidance

See also
William Shatner's musical career

1977 live albums
William Shatner albums